SeaBIOS is an open-source implementation of an x86 BIOS, serving as a freely available firmware for x86 systems. Aiming for compatibility, it supports standard BIOS features and calling interfaces that are implemented by a typical proprietary x86 BIOS. SeaBIOS can either run on bare hardware as a coreboot payload, or can be used directly in emulators such as QEMU and Bochs.

Initially, SeaBIOS was based on the open-source BIOS implementation included with the Bochs emulator. The project was created with intentions to allow native usage on x86 hardware, and to be based on an improved and more easily extendable internal source code implementation.

Features
Features supported by SeaBIOS include the following:

 Graphical bootsplash screen (JPEG and BMP)
 USB keyboard and mouse support
 USB Mass Storage boot support
 USB Attached SCSI boot support
 ATA support
 AHCI support
 NVMe support
 El Torito optical disc drive boot support
 BIOS Boot Specification (BBS)
 Rebooting on Control-Alt-Delete key press
 Network booting support e.g. iPXE or gPXE
 Logical block addressing (LBA)
 POST Memory Manager (PMM)
 Paravirtualization, Xen HVM, VirtIO
 Coreboot Payloads (LZMA compressed)
 PCI Firmware Specification
 SeaBIOS as a Compatibility Support Module (CSM) for Unified Extensible Firmware Interface (UEFI) and Open Virtual Machine Firmware (OVMF)
 Virtual machine host notification of paravirtualized guests which panic via the pvpanic driver
 A patch exists to load the SLIC table from a licensed OEM Windows BIOS.
 Trusted Platform Module
 Enhanced Disk Drive (EDD) (INT 13H extensions)
 e820 memory map
 Protected mode interfaces, e.g. APM, Legacy PnP, DMI, MPS, SMBIOS, VBE, and ACPI
 System Management Mode
 Does not support ESCD
 Does not support Intel ME or AMD PSP or its modules.

SeaBIOS's boot device selection menu can be accessed by pressing  during the boot process.

Uses
SeaBIOS can run natively on x86 hardware, in which case it is loaded by either coreboot or Libreboot as a payload; it runs on 386 and later processors, and requires a minimum of 1 MB of RAM. Compiled SeaBIOS images can be flashed into supported motherboards using flashrom. SeaBIOS also runs inside an emulator; it is the default BIOS for the QEMU and KVM virtualization environments, and can be used with the Bochs emulator. It is also included in some Chromebooks, although it is not used by ChromeOS.

Development
Most of the SeaBIOS source code is written in C, with its build system relying on the standard GNU toolchain. SeaBIOS has been tested with various bootloaders and operating systems, including GNU GRUB, LILO, SYSLINUX, Microsoft Windows, Linux, FreeDOS, FreeBSD, NetBSD and OpenBSD.

See also

 BIOS features comparison
 TianoCore

References

External links
 
 Find your way through the x86 firmware maze covers the SeaBIOS boot sequence and memory maps

Free BIOS implementations
2008 software
Free software programmed in C
Open-source firmware